Cherokee High School may refer to one of several high schools in the United States:

Cherokee High School (Alabama), Cherokee, Alabama
Cherokee High School (Georgia), Canton, Georgia
Cherokee High School (New Jersey), Marlton, New Jersey
Cherokee High School (North Carolina), Cherokee, North Carolina
Cherokee High School (Oklahoma), Cherokee, Oklahoma
Cherokee High School (Tennessee), Rogersville, Tennessee
Cherokee High School (Texas), Cherokee, Texas